"Let U Go" is a song by American musician Ashley Parker Angel from his debut studio album Soundtrack to Your Life (2006). It was released to radio as the lead single from the album on February 14, 2006, by Blackground Records and Universal Records. The song was written by Parker, Max Martin, and Lukasz "Dr. Luke" Gottwald, whilst production was helmed by Martin and Dr. Luke. The song peaked at number 12 on the Billboard Hot 100 chart, in addition to peaking at number 10 on the Pop 100 chart.

Critical reception
Chuck Taylor of Billboard referred to the song as a "wheely-squealing pop/rock headbanger" that "fits well within the 'TRL' template for uptempo pubescent pop."

Music video
This music video takes place in two places. In the beginning it seems Ashley and his band are in a basement. He begins to play the song and the walls begin to shake. After that the walls fall and the band ends up in a club with screaming fans all around. He moves to a secluded area and the music stops. It begins again as a strobe light begins to flash. The song starts to end and the club changes to the front of a theater which says "Ashley Parker Angel, One Night Only". The song ends and Ashley throws his guitar over his shoulder and walks away. It premiered on TRL on March 14, 2006 and went to number one soon after.

Credits and personnel
Credits and personnel are adapted from the Soundtrack to Your Life album liner notes.
 Ashley Parker Angel – writer, vocals
 Max Martin – writer, producer, all instruments except drums
 Lukasz "Dr. Luke" Gottwald – writer, producer, all instruments except drums
 Seth Waldmann – recording
 Ross Hogarth – recording, engineering
 Rob Kinelski – recording, engineering
 Randy Staub – mixing
 Dorian Crozier – drums
 Mike Fasano – drum tech
 Bob Ludwig – mastering

Charts

Release history

References

External links
Top 40.about.com Review.
Chart history on Top40-charts.com.
[ Chart history on AMG.]

2006 debut singles
Ashley Parker Angel songs
Music videos directed by Marc Klasfeld
Song recordings produced by Max Martin
Songs written by Dr. Luke
Songs written by Max Martin
Song recordings produced by Dr. Luke